The Yangon Children's Hospital (YCH) is a major public hospital in Yangon, Myanmar.The hospital was formerly known as "Jamatkhana Hospital" as the hospital was built on the site of  former Gymkhana Club, an elite social club during colonial eras.  The YCH was established in 1960 under the Yangon General Hospital with a capacity of 60 beds. In 1962–1963, the hospital moved to Myenigon with the capacity of 80 beds. In 1963, the hospital moved again to current  compound. The current main building was built in 1970 with Canadian aid, and opened in September 1978. Since then, a new three-story annex building with 550 beds has been added.

Intensive Care Unit (ICU) 
The ICU was renovated in 2009 with full equipment donated by Levi Sap Nei Thang, the founder of I Love Myanmar, in memory of her daughter Emmanuel Chia Ai Linn who was admitted to the Yangon Children's Hospital before her passing in 2008.

Gallery

See also
 List of hospitals in Yangon

References

Hospital buildings completed in 1960
Hospitals in Yangon
Hospitals established in 1960